The 74th Pennsylvania House of Representatives District is located in southeast Pennsylvania and has been represented by Dan K. Williams since 2019.

District profile
The 74th District is located in Chester County and includes the following areas:

Atglen
Caln Township (part)
District 01
District 02
District 03
Coatesville
Honey Brook
Honey Brook Township
Modena
Parkesburg
Sadsbury Township
South Coatesville
Valley Township
West Caln Township
West Sadsbury Township

Representatives

Recent election results

References

Government of Chester County, Pennsylvania
74